Jarno Koskiranta (born December 9, 1986) is a Finnish professional ice hockey forward. He is currently playing with SaiPa of the Liiga.

Playing career
Koskiranta made his Finnish SM-liiga debut playing with SaiPa during the  2009–10 SM-liiga season. After two seasons with HC Sibir Novosibirsk on May 1, 2015, Koskiranta left to sign with newly crowned KHL champions SKA Saint Petersburg.

Koskiranta remained with SKA over the following five seasons, before returning to original Finnish club, SaiPa, on a three-year contract on 20 May 2020.

Career statistics

Regular season and playoffs

International

Awards and honors

References

External links

1986 births
Jokipojat players
Living people
People from Paimio
SaiPa players
HC Sibir Novosibirsk players
SKA Saint Petersburg players
Tappara players
Ice hockey players at the 2018 Winter Olympics
Olympic ice hockey players of Finland
Finnish ice hockey forwards
Sportspeople from Southwest Finland